Bedia is a village in the Tkvarcheli District of Abkhazia. As a result of the Georgian dispute over the sovereignty of Abkhazia, Georgia claims the village as part of its Gali Municipality. As of 2011, the village had a population of 288, of which 85.5% of them were ethnic Georgians and 13.6% were ethnic Abkhaz, with 2 others living in the village.

History
According to the medieval Georgian Chronicles, Egros, son of Togarmah, inherited the land between the Likhi Range, Black Sea and upper Khazar River where he settled and found a city Egrisi, which is now called Bedia.

See also
Bedia Cathedral

References

Populated places in Tkvarcheli District
Sukhum Okrug